David C. Muddiman is an American chemist and distinguished professor of chemistry at North Carolina State University in Raleigh, North Carolina.  His research is focused on developing innovative tools for mass spectrometry based proteomics, metabolomics, and glycomics as well as novel imaging mass spectrometry ionization methods.

He received his B.S. in Chemistry with a Minor in Business (1985) and a Ph.D. from the University of Pittsburgh in Bioanalytical Chemistry, and he carried out a post-doctoral fellowship at the Pacific Northwest National Laboratory (1995–1997). His independent academic career prior to his appointment at NC State University were at Virginia Commonwealth University (1997–2002) and the Mayo Clinic College of Medicine (2002–2005).

He has received several awards during his career including the Arthur F. Findeis Award from the American Chemical Society (2004), the NC State Alumni Association Outstanding Research Award (2009), and was the recipient of the Biemann Medal (2010).

References

External links
Current Research Page at NC State University

Living people
North Carolina State University faculty
University of Pittsburgh alumni
Year of birth missing (living people)
Place of birth missing (living people)
21st-century American chemists
Mass spectrometrists